Priscilla Langford Buckley (October 17, 1921 – March 25, 2012) was an American journalist and author who was the longtime managing editor of National Review.

Biography
Buckley was born in New York City. She was the third of 10 children of William Frank Buckley Sr., and Aloise Josephine Antonia Steiner. Buckley's siblings included future United States Senator and federal judge James L. Buckley and William F. Buckley Jr., a future conservative author. She graduated with a degree in history in 1943 from Smith College, while there, one of her best friends was Betty Friedan.  She worked for the CIA in the 1950s and for United Press from 1944 to 1948 (in New York) and again from 1953 to 1956 (in Paris). 

Priscilla Buckley started working at William F. Buckley's publication, National Review, in 1956. She became managing editor of the publication in 1959 following the retirement of the publication's original managing editor, Suzanne La Follette. Whittaker Chambers recommended Buckley for the position. Buckley served as managing editor until 1985 and continued working at National Review until 1999. She worked at National Review for a total of 43 years. According to The New York Times, Buckley's influence at National Review led some to refer to the publication as "Miss Buckley’s Finishing School for Young Ladies and Gentlemen of Conservative Persuasion". Writers whom she helped to train include Paul Gigot, Bill McGurn, Mona Charen, and Anthony R. Dolan. Buckley authored String of Pearls, a 2001 memoir about international journalism, and a 2005 book entitled Living It Up with National Review: A Memoir.

Buckley died of kidney failure on March 25, 2012 at the age of 90 at Great Elm, the house in Sharon, Connecticut where she lived and where she and her siblings had grown up.

References

1921 births
2012 deaths
Buckley family
National Review people
Writers from Connecticut
Writers from New York City
People from Sharon, Connecticut
21st-century American women writers
American women non-fiction writers
21st-century American non-fiction writers